Milan Lazarević (born 10 January 1997) is a Serbian footballer who plays as a defender for Vojvodina.

Career
Coming from Milići where he started playing football, Lazarević played for RFK Novi Sad before he joined Vojvodina youth ranks. At the beginning of 2016, Lazarević moved in Serbian First League club Proleter, where he stayed until the end of 2015–16 season scoring 1 goal on 10 appearances. In summer 2016, he returned to Vojvodina, but also continued training with Proleter. In May 2018, Lazarević signed his first professional contract, a two-year-deal with Vojvodina. On 26 January 2020 he signed a two-year-deal with Rad. On 22 July 2021 Lazarević signed a half-year deal with Liepāja. On 15 January 2022 he returned to Vojvodina, and signed a 2,5 year deal.

Career statistics

References

External links
 
 
 
 

1997 births
People from Milići
Living people
Association football defenders
Serbian footballers
FK Proleter Novi Sad players
FK Vojvodina players
FK Rad players
FK Liepāja players
Serbian SuperLiga players
Serbian First League players
Latvian Higher League players
Serbian expatriate footballers
Expatriate footballers in Latvia
Serbian expatriate sportspeople in Latvia